Badri Pandey is a Nepali politician belonging to Nepali Congress. He was a member of National assembly elected from 2018 elections. He was elected in 2022 from Bajura to the House of Representatives.

He is the elected deputy general secretary of the ruling party elected by 14th general convention of Nepali Congress.

Political life 
Pandey was elected member of second constituent assembly from proportional list of Nepali Congress. Following this, he was elected member of National Assembly from Sudurpaschim province where he represented Nepali Congress. 

From the he was elected deputy general secretary of the party on Backward quota defeating incumbent Karnali Chief Minister Jeevan Bahadur Shahi.

References 

People from Bajura District
Nepali Congress politicians from Sudurpashchim Province
Members of the National Assembly (Nepal)
Year of birth missing (living people)
Living people